The 1994–95 Santa Clara Broncos men's basketball team represented Santa Clara University in the 1994-95 Season. Led by head coach Dick Davey, the Broncos finished with a record of 21-7, and a WCC record of 12-2, placing first in the West Coast Conference. After losing in the first round of the West coast Conference tournament to Loyola Marymount, the school received an at-large bid into the NCAA tournament, where they were beaten by Mississippi State in the first round. Throughout the season, Canadian point guard Steve Nash was a standout performer for the Broncos, winning the WCC Player of the Year. Following the season, Nash would contemplate entering the NBA draft, but elected to return for his senior season.

Roster

Schedule and results

|-
!colspan=9 style=| Regular Season

|-
!colspan=9 style=| WCC Tournament

|-
!colspan=9 style=| NCAA Tournament

Awards and honors
Steve Nash – WCC Player of the Year

References

Santa Clara Broncos men's basketball seasons
Santa Clara
1994 in sports in California
1995 in sports in California
Santa Clara